The 2007–08 Carolina Hurricanes season began October 3, 2007. It was the franchise's 36th season, 29th season in the National Hockey League (NHL) and 10th as the Hurricanes.

Key dates prior to the start of the season:

The 2007 NHL Entry Draft took place in Columbus, Ohio, on June 22–23.
The free agency period began on July 1.

Regular season
The Hurricanes had the most power-play opportunities of all 30 NHL teams, with 420.

Divisional standings

Conference standings

Schedule and results

October

Record: 7–3–3; Home: 3–1–1; Road: 4–2–2

November

Record: 7–6–0; Home: 5–4–0; Road: 2–2–0

December

Record: 5–10–0; Home: 2–3–0; Road: 3–7–0

January

Record: 6–6–1; Home: 3–3–1; Road: 3–3–0

February

Record: 7–5–1; Home: 5–1–1; Road: 2–4–0

March

Record: 9–2–1; Home: 5–0–1; Road: 4–2–0

April

Record: 1–2–0; Home: 1–1–0; Road: 0–1–0

Playoffs
The Hurricanes missed the playoffs for the second consecutive year. They are the first team to miss the playoffs twice in a row after winning the Stanley Cup since the 1922 Toronto St. Patricks.

Player statistics

Skaters

Note: GP = Games played; G = Goals; A = Assists; Pts = Points; +/- = Plus/minus; PIM = Penalty minutes

Goaltenders
Note: GP = Games played; MIN = Time on ice (minutes); GAA = Goals against average; W = Wins; L = Losses; OT = Overtime losses; SO = Shutouts; SA = Saves; GA = Goals allowed; SV%= Save percentage

Awards and records

Records

Milestones

Transactions
The Hurricanes have been involved in the following transactions during the 2007–08 season.

Draft picks
Carolina's picks at the 2007 NHL Entry Draft in Columbus, Ohio.  The Hurricanes have the 11th overall pick.

Farm teams

American Hockey League
The Albany River Rats are the Hurricanes American Hockey League affiliate for the 2007–08 AHL season.

ECHL
The Florida Everblades are the Hurricanes ECHL affiliate.

References

 

Carol
Carol
Carolina Hurricanes seasons
Hurr
Hurr